Darrell Trayler Hogan (July 2, 1926 – April 6, 2016) was an American football player who played five seasons with the Pittsburgh Steelers of the National Football League. Hogan attended Hot Wells High School in Hot Wells, Texas. He first enrolled at Baylor University before transferring to Trinity University. He coached high school football and track and field in Texas after his playing days. He was inducted into the Trinity University Athletics Hall of Fame in 2003. He died on April 6, 2016.

References

External links
Just Sports Stats

1926 births
2016 deaths
Players of American football from San Antonio
American football linebackers
American football guards
Baylor Bears football players
Trinity Tigers football players
Pittsburgh Steelers players
People from Bandera, Texas